Father Camille DesRosiers, S.M. (14 October 1928 − 16 May 2016) was a Canadian-born Roman Catholic priest who served as the Ecclesiastical Superior of the Mission Sui Iuris of Funafuti from 1986 to 2010.

DesRosiers was born in Grand-Métis, Quebec, Canada. In the young age, he joined an Institute of Consecrated Life of Society of Mary (Marists) and was professed on 8 September 1950 and ordained as priest on 4 June 1955. After ordination in served in Samoa, American Samoa and on Nukunonu in Tokelau. In November 1985 he was asked to introduce Bishop John Rodgers to the people of Tuvalu as the new Ecclesiastical Superior. When Rodgers retired due to ill-health in 1986, DesRosiers was appointed to replace him. He spent 25 years in Tuvalu, before retiring in 2011.

References 

1928 births
2016 deaths
20th-century Canadian Roman Catholic priests
21st-century Canadian Roman Catholic priests
Marist Brothers
Roman Catholic missionaries in Tuvalu